

The Niess 1-80, also known as Galeão 5 FG, was a military and civilian trainer aircraft built in Brazil during the 1950s. It was originally developed by Marc Niess as an prototype based on the CAP-4 Paulistinha, which he worked while employed at Companhia Aeronáutica Paulista.

Development
In early 1952, the Brazilian Air Force decided to use Fábrica do Galeão to build a light trainer for the Brazilian air clubs, and chose the 1-80(in Portuguese: Um-Oitenta) prototype airplane by designer Marc Niess. The tests for aeronautical certification began at Campo de Marte, where the plane was approved soon after. The engineers decided to make some modifications to the original design of the plane, structural changes in the wings that become made of plywood, and the fuel capacity was increased. 

After the modifications, the now called Galeão 5 FG, were more robust and had greater range, although they were inferior in aerobatic practices. It proved to be a very difficult aircraft to control, and was not recommended for basic pilot instruction. Even so, a couple of units were donated to Brazilian flying clubs, and a few others went to Paraguay and Uruguay.

Operators

Brazilian Navy

Specifications (Galeão 5 FG)

References
Notes

Bibliography

External links
 Photo on Flickr
 Brazilian Naval Air Arm - CAP Paulistinha

Single-engined tractor aircraft
High-wing aircraft
1950s Brazilian military trainer aircraft
1950s Brazilian civil trainer aircraft
Aircraft first flown in 1952